How to Be a Girl is a podcast about what it means to be a girl and what it is like to raise a transgender child.

Background 
The podcast is about Marlo Mack raising her 13-year-old transgender daughter. Mack is a single mom living in Seattle. The show has had Jazz Jennings as a guest. Marlo Mack wrote a piece in The New York Times about the podcast, which says that Marlo Mack is a pseudonym.

Reception 
In 2015, The Atlantic included episode seven "The Facts" on their list of "The 50 Best Podcast Episodes of 2015". In 2016, The Guardian and The Atlantic called the podcast one of "The 50 best podcasts of 2016". In 2017, Time listed the podcast as one of "The 50 Best Podcasts Right Now".

Awards

Adaptions 
Marlo Mack has adapted How to be a Girl into a memoir that is available as an audiobook.

References 

Feminist podcasts
LGBT-related podcasts
Works about parenting
Transgender-related mass media